2nd Multi-member Constituency - Burgas is a constituency whose borders are the same as Burgas Province.

Background

In the 2009 Bulgarian parliamentary election 2nd MMC – Burgas elected 12 members in the Bulgarian National Assembly, 11 of which were through proportionality vote and 1 was through first-past-the-post voting.

Members in the Bulgarian National Assembly
 Through first-past-the-post voting

 Through proportionality vote

Elections
2009 election

 proportionality vote

 first-past-the-post voting

See also
2009 Bulgarian parliamentary election
Politics of Bulgaria
List of Bulgarian Constituencies

References

Electoral divisions in Bulgaria
Burgas Province